Hell, etc. was Marilyn Manson's third art exhibition, held in Athens, Greece. The exhibition was open to the public from April 28, 2010 until May 2, 2010. Manson's more recent artworks and newly revealed pieces at the time, were displayed.

Background
The art exhibition was scheduled to run from April 21, 2010, until April 25, 2010, however due to a volcanic ash cloud, it was postponed to run from April 28, 2010 until May 2, 2010. This was correctly reported by E-Go.Gr.

The exhibition was held at the Athenian Cultural Centre. The exhibition opened at 10:00 daily and was open until 22:00. Flash photography was prohibited inside the exhibition, as the watercolor paintings were extremely sensitive to the flash.

References

External links
 Official Marilyn Manson website

Visual arts exhibitions
April 2010 events in Europe
May 2010 events in Europe
2010 in Greece